In the mathematical theory of knots, the Fáry–Milnor theorem, named after István Fáry and John Milnor, states that three-dimensional smooth curves with small total curvature must be unknotted. The theorem was proved independently by Fáry in 1949 and Milnor in 1950. It was later shown to follow from the existence of quadrisecants .

Statement
If K is any closed curve in Euclidean space that is sufficiently smooth to define the  curvature κ at each of its points, and if the total absolute curvature is less than or equal to 4π, then K is an unknot, i.e.:
 

The contrapositive tells us that if K is not an unknot, i.e. K is not isotopic to the circle, then the total curvature will be strictly greater than 4π. Notice that having the total curvature less than or equal to 4 is merely a sufficient condition for K to be an unknot; it is not a necessary condition. In other words, although all knots with total curvature less than or equal to 4π are the unknot, there exist unknots with curvature strictly greater than 4π.

Generalizations to non-smooth curves
For closed polygonal chains the same result holds with the integral of curvature replaced by the sum of angles between adjacent segments of the chain. By approximating arbitrary curves by polygonal chains, one may extend the definition of total curvature to larger classes of curves, within which the Fáry–Milnor theorem also holds.

References
.
.
.
.

External links
. Fenner describes a geometric proof of the theorem, and of the related theorem that any smooth closed curve has total curvature at least 2π.

Knot theory
Theorems in topology